Yehuda Shoenfeld (born February 14, 1948) is an Israeli physician and autoimmunity researcher.

Biography
Yehuda Shoenfeld works at Sheba Medical Center in Tel HaShomer and the Sackler Faculty of Medicine at Tel-Aviv University. He studied at the Hebrew University of Jerusalem. He is the incumbent of the Laura Schwarz-Kipp Chair for Research of Autoimmune Diseases. Shoenfeld is the editor of two journals, Harefuah (Medicine) in Hebrew with English abstracts and Israel Medical Association Journal (IMAJ). He is co-editor-in-chief of Autoimmunity Reviews, and co-editor of the Journal of Autoimmunity, and member of the editorial board of the Clinical Reviews in Allergy & Immunology.

Schoenfeld, who has been characterized as an anti-vaccinationist, proposed a syndrome he calls Autoimmune Syndrome Induced by Adjuvants (ASIA), which purports to be an autoimmune response to vaccine adjuvants.  There is a lack of reproducible evidence for any causal relationship between adjuvant and autoimmune condition. He served on the scientific advisory board of the anti-vaccine group Children's Medical Safety Research Institute, has spoken at a number of antivaccination conferences, and has regularly appeared as an expert witness for people attempting to prove injury from vaccines in court. The courts, so far, have rejected the theory that ASIA caused those injuries and questioned Schoenfeld's overall credibility as a truthful witness.

Published works
While two of Shoenfeld's scientific articles have been retracted, he has published more than 1920 papers. Also, he has authored and edited 40 books and contributed more than 350 chapters to various books, most recently Vaccines and Autoimmunity published by Wiley Blackwell. Prof. Shoenfeld is on the editorial board of 43 medical journals. Nili Cohen, President of the Israel Academy of Sciences and Humanities, has pointed out that "no human being can publish 1,939 papers" unless Shoenfeld’s true contribution to this vast amount of publications is insignificant. She calculated that 1.54 papers per week have been published on average. Besides, the majority of his cited papers have nothing to do with vaccines or autoimmunity.

A 2016 paper asserting a link between HPV vaccine and behavioural problems in mice, was retracted due to concerns about its methodology and data.

Awards and recognition
Shoenfeld received the EULAR Prize (Austria, 2005). He received the Nelson’s Prize for Humanity and Science from U.C. Davis (U.S., 2008). He was honored as Doctoris Honoris Causa by Debrecen University (Hungary, 2009). He has awarded a Life Contribution Prize in Internal Medicine (Israel, 2012), as well as the ACR Master Award (U.S., 2013). He is an honorary member of the Hungarian Association of Rheumatology, Slovenian National Academy of Sciences and the Royal Society of Physicians (UK).

References

External links
Session 13, Vaccine Safety Conference, Jamaica, 2011, "Autoimmune (Auto-Inflammatory)Syndrome Induced by Adjuvant: A New Syndrome to be Defined"
Autoimmunity Congress, Through The Eyes of Participants and Professor Shoenfeld
Autoimmunity Congress 
Latin American Congress on Autoimmunity 
 International Congress on Controversies in Rheumatology and Autoimmunity 

Living people
Israeli immunologists
Medical journal editors
Articles containing video clips
1948 births
Academic staff of Tel Aviv University
The Hebrew University-Hadassah Medical School alumni